The Seats-to-votes ratio, also known as the advantage ratio,  is a measure of equal representation of voters. The equation for seats-to-votes ratio for a political party i is:
 ,

In the case both seats and votes are represented as fractions or percentages, then every voter has equal representation if the seats-to-votes ratio is 1. The principle of equal representation is expressed in slogan one man, one vote and relates to proportional representation.

Related is the votes-per-seat-won, which is inverse to the seats-to-votes ratio.

Relation to disproportionality indices
The Sainte-Laguë Index is a disproportionality index derived by applying the Pearson's chi-squared test to the seats-to-votes ratio.

Relation to seat allocation methods
Different seat allocation methods such as D'Hondt method and Sainte-Laguë method differ in the seats-to-votes ratio for individual parties. The proportionality of seat allocation methods can be proven by calculating the seats-to-votes ratio.

Seats-to-votes ratio for D'Hondt method 

The D'Hondt method approximates proportionality by minimizing the largest seats-to-votes ratio among all parties. The largest seats-to-votes ratio, which measures how over-represented the most over-represented party among all parties is:

The D'Hondt method minimizes the largest seats-to-votes ratio by assigning the seats,

where  is a seat allocation from the set of all allowed seat allocations . The D'Hondt method splits the votes into exactly proportionally represented ones and residual ones, minimizing the overall amount of the residuals in the process. The overall fraction of residual votes is

Notes 

Electoral systems
Psephology